Jim Milhon (born 1935) is a former American football coach.  He was the sixth head football coach for the Azusa Pacific University in Azusa, California, serving for 17 seasons, from 1978 until 1994, and compiling a record of 81–69–4.

References

Year of birth missing (living people)
1930s births
Living people
Azusa Pacific Cougars football coaches